Perdóname (Forgive Me) is the debut album by Panamian singer-songwriter Eddy Lover. It was released on August 12, 2008. The first single of the album was titled "Luna", which garnered much airplay on the radio.

Track listing

Charts

Certification

References

External links 

2008 debut albums
Machete Music albums
Eddy Lover albums